Maera danae is a species of crustacean in the genus Maera. It is found in the Western Atlantic Ocean off the coast of Eastern Canada.

It was first described in 1853 by William Stimpson as Leptothoe danae.

References 

Crustaceans described in 1853
Maeridae
Taxa named by William Stimpson
Taxa described in 1853